Landon Bussie (born c. 1988) is an American college basketball coach who is the current head coach of Alcorn State team.

Playing career
Bussie played his first two years at Livingstone College before finishing his playing career at Xavier University of Louisiana.

Coaching career

XULA
Bussie started his coaching career at his Alma mater. He was an assistant coach at XULA for four seasons.

Prairie View A&M
Bussie was first hired by Prairie View A&M as the women’s assistant coach. Bussie then switched over to the men’s side. Bussie is credited with recruiting several key contributors to the team.

Alcorn State
On April 23, Bussie was named the new head men’s basketball coach at Alcorn State. He replaces Montez Robinson, who had one winning season in five years.

Head coaching record

Personal life
Bussie is the brother of WNBA player Asya Bussie.

References

External links
Prairie View A&M bio
Alcorn State bio

1980s births
Living people
Alcorn State Braves basketball coaches
American men's basketball coaches
American women's basketball coaches
College men's basketball head coaches in the United States
Livingstone College alumni
Prairie View A&M Lady Panthers basketball coaches
Prairie View A&M Panthers basketball coaches
Xavier Gold Rush basketball coaches
Xavier Gold Rush basketball players